Pteromeris perplana, or the flat cardita, is a species of bivalve mollusc in the family Carditidae. It can be found along the Atlantic coast of North America, ranging from North Carolina to Florida.

References

Carditidae
Bivalves described in 1841